Millwater is a northern suburb of Auckland, located in New Zealand. It is about 33 kilometres (by road) north of the city centre. The Auckland Northern Motorway and Orewa River form its western and northern boundaries respectively.

Millwater was built on former farmland from 2005. Development is expected to be complete in 2022, with an anticipated population of 10,000.

A companion suburb of Milldale is intended on the other side of the Northern Motorway, and this might include a new primary school for the area.

Demographics

Millwater had a population of 5,946 at the 2018 New Zealand census, an increase of 5,079 people (585.8%) since the 2013 census, and an increase of 5,847 people (5906.1%) since the 2006 census. There were 1,785 households, comprising 2,928 males and 3,015 females, giving a sex ratio of 0.97 males per female, with 1,605 people (27.0%) aged under 15 years, 912 (15.3%) aged 15 to 29, 2,907 (48.9%) aged 30 to 64, and 522 (8.8%) aged 65 or older.

Ethnicities were 67.2% European/Pākehā, 4.8% Māori, 1.0% Pacific peoples, 30.8% Asian, and 2.9% other ethnicities. People may identify with more than one ethnicity.

The percentage of people born overseas was 48.1, compared with 27.1% nationally.

Although some people chose not to answer the census's question about religious affiliation, 51.7% had no religion, 37.9% were Christian, 0.1% had Māori religious beliefs, 1.8% were Hindu, 0.8% were Muslim, 1.8% were Buddhist and 0.8% had other religions.

Of those at least 15 years old, 1,455 (33.5%) people had a bachelor's or higher degree, and 378 (8.7%) people had no formal qualifications. 1,383 people (31.9%) earned over $70,000 compared to 17.2% nationally. The employment status of those at least 15 was that 2,436 (56.1%) people were employed full-time, 624 (14.4%) were part-time, and 129 (3.0%) were unemployed.

Notes

Populated places in the Auckland Region
Hibiscus Coast